Mark Nelson (born July 25, 1956) is a gridiron football coach and a former professional Canadian football linebacker. He is the special teams coordinator and linebackers coach for the Carleton Ravens of U Sports. He played for seven seasons in the Canadian Football League (CFL) for the Calgary Stampeders and Saskatchewan Roughriders. He is a three-time Grey Cup champion having won as a coach in 1993, 1996 and 2016.

Playing career
Nelson played college football for the East Central Oklahoma State Tigers. Nelson was drafted in the 1980 CFL Draft by the Calgary Stampeders where he played for 7 years before retiring with the Saskatchewan Roughriders in 1987. Nelson played linebacker and fullback during his CFL run.

Coaching career
Nelson has coached for 16 different teams. More recently, on December 20, 2013, he was named the Ottawa Redblacks' defensive coordinator. In 2018, he was demoted from defensive coordinator for the Redblacks to their linebackers coach. 

On February 6, 2020, it was announced that Nelson had joined the Toronto Argonauts as the team's special teams coordinator. The league did not play in 2020, so he coached for one season with the Argonauts in 2021. He was not retained by the team for the 2022 season.

On June 23, 2022, it was announced that Nelson had joined the Carleton Ravens to serve as the team's special teams coordinator and linebackers coach.

Personal life
Nelson's father, Roger is on the Edmonton Eskimo's Wall of Honour and was inducted into the Canadian Football Hall of Fame. His son, Kyle was a long snapper for the San Francisco 49ers.

References

1956 births
Living people
American football linebackers
Canadian football linebackers
Canadian players of American football
Players of Canadian football from Alberta
Arkansas Tech Wonder Boys football coaches
Baylor Bears football coaches
Calgary Stampeders players
East Central Tigers football players
Edmonton Elks coaches
Kentucky Wildcats football coaches
Louisville Cardinals football coaches
Montreal Alouettes coaches
Ottawa Redblacks coaches
San Antonio Texans coaches
Saskatchewan Roughriders players
Toronto Argonauts coaches
Tulsa Golden Hurricane football coaches
Valdosta State Blazers football coaches
Winnipeg Blue Bombers coaches
High school football coaches in Oklahoma
Junior college football coaches in the United States
Canadian football people from Edmonton